Batik is an Indonesian technique of wax-resist dyeing applied to the whole cloth. This technique originated from the island of Java, Indonesia. Batik is made either by drawing dots and lines of the resist with a spouted tool called a canting, or by printing the resist with a copper stamp called a cap. The applied wax resists dyes and therefore allows the artisan to colour selectively by soaking the cloth in one colour, removing the wax with boiling water, and repeating if multiple colours are desired.

Batik is an ancient art form of Indonesia made with wax resistant dye on fabrics. Indonesian coastal batik (batik pesisir) made in the island of Java has a history of acculturation, a mixture of native and foreign cultures. It is a newer model compared to inland batik, and it uses more colors, though the patterns are a lot less intricate. This is because inland batik used to be made by select experts living in palace areas, while coastal batik can be made by anyone.

Batik is very important to Indonesians and many people wear it to formal or casual events. Batik is commonly used by Indonesians in various rituals, ceremonies, traditions, celebrations, and even in daily uses.

On October 2, 2009, UNESCO officially recognized the batik—written batik (batik tulis) and stamped batik (batik cap)—as a Masterpiece of Oral and Intangible Heritage of Humanity from Indonesia, and encouraged the Indonesian people and the Indonesian government to safeguard, transmit, promote, and develop the craftsmanship of batik. Since then, Indonesia celebrates "the National Batik Day" annually on October 2. Nowadays, Indonesians wear batik in honor of this ancient tradition.

In the same year, UNESCO also recognized "Education and training in Indonesian Batik intangible cultural heritage for elementary, junior, senior, vocational school and polytechnic students, in collaboration with the Batik Museum in Pekalongan" as a Masterpiece of Oral and Intangible Heritage of Humanity in the Register of Good Safeguarding Practices List.

Etymology
The word  is Javanese in origin. The word bathikan also means "drawing" or "writing" in Javanese. When the word is absorbed to Indonesian and also Malay the "th-" sound is reduced to a "t-" sound more pronouncable to non-Javanese speakers.

The word  is first recorded in English in the Encyclopædia Britannica of 1880, in which it is spelled as battik. It is attested in the Indonesian Archipelago during the Dutch colonial period in various forms such as mbatik, mbatek, batik and batek.

History

Batik is an ancient fabric wax-resist dyeing tradition of Java, Indonesia. The art of batik is most highly developed and some of the best batiks in the world still made there. In Java, all the materials for the process are readily available—cotton and beeswax and plants from which different vegetable dyes are made. Indonesian batik predates written records: G. P. Rouffaer argues that the technique might have been introduced during the 6th or 7th century from India or Sri Lanka. On the other hand, the Dutch archaeologist J.L.A. Brandes and the Indonesian archaeologist F.A. Sutjipto believe Indonesian batik is a native tradition, since several regions in Indonesia such as Toraja, Flores, and Halmahera which were not directly influenced by Hinduism, have attested batik making tradition as well.

The existence of the oldest Batik activities came from Ponorogo which was still called Wengker before the 7th century, the Kingdom in Central Java learned batik from Ponorogo. Because of this, Ponorogo batik is somewhat similar to batik circulating in Central Java, except that the batik produced by Ponorogo is generally dark black or commonly called batik irengan because it is close to magical elements so that it was developed by the kingdoms in Central Java and Yogyakarta.

Based on the contents of the Sundanese Manuscript, Sundanese people have known about Batik since the 12th century. Based on ancient Sundanese manuscript Sanghyang Siksa Kandang Karesian written 1518 AD, it is recorded that Sundanese having batik which is identical and representative of Sundanese culture in general. Several motif are even noted in the text, based on those data sources the process of Batik Sundanese creation begins step by step.

Rouffaer reported that the gringsing pattern was already known by the 12th century in Kediri, East Java. He concluded that this delicate pattern could be created only by using the canting, an etching tool that holds a small reservoir of hot wax invented in Java around that time. The carving details of clothes worn by East Javanese Prajnaparamita statues from around the 13th century show intricate floral patterns within rounded margins, similar to today's traditional Javanese  or  batik motif. The motif is thought to represent the lotus, a sacred flower in Hindu-Buddhist beliefs. This evidence suggests that intricate batik fabric patterns applied with the canting existed in 13th-century Java or even earlier. By the last quarter of the 13th century, the batik cloth from Java has been exported to Karimata islands, Siam, even as far as Mosul.

In Europe, the technique was described for the first time in the "History of Java", published in London in 1817 by Stamford Raffles, who had been a British governor of Bengkulu, Sumatra. In 1873 the Dutch merchant Van Rijckevorsel gave the pieces he collected during a trip to Indonesia to the ethnographic museum in Rotterdam. Today the Tropenmuseum houses the biggest collection of Indonesian batik in the Netherlands. Displayed at the Exposition Universelle at Paris in 1900, the Indonesian batik impressed the public and artists.

The Dutch Indo Europeans and Chinese settlers were active in developing batik, particularly coastal batik, in the late colonial era. Between 1811 and 1946, there was a breed of batik known as Batik Belanda. Which was basically a batik industry ran by the Indo Europeans in the East Indies. The patterns and styles reflected European style and taste with a fusion of local indigenous culture. It was quite successful, as such several prominent batik ateliers appeared and was exported to Singapore, and the Netherlands. The industry itself collapsed after WW II and the Indonesian independence.

In the 1920s, Javanese batik makers migrating to Malay Peninsula (present-day Malaysia, South Thailand, and southern tip of Myanmar) introduced the use of wax and copper blocks to its east coast.

In Subsaharan Africa, Javanese batik was introduced in the 19th century by Dutch and English merchants and batik makers. The local people there adapted the Javanese batik, making larger motifs with thicker lines and more colours. Locally it is known as African wax prints or Dutch wax prints. In the 1970s, batik was introduced to Australia, where aboriginal artists at Erna Bella have developed it as their own craft.

In Africa, it was originally practised by the Yoruba tribe in Nigeria, Soninke and Wolof in Senegal. This African version, however, uses cassava starch or rice paste, or mud as a resist instead of beeswax.

Techniques

Initially, batik making techniques only used "written batik" (batik tulis) techniques. This batik tulis is known as the original batik from generation to generation from the Indonesian nation's ancestors because the process and workmanship are still very traditional and manual. Then the technique developed with the discovery of the stamped batik (batik cap) technique which made batik work faster. The batik tulis and batik cap techniques are recognized by UNESCO as a Masterpiece of Oral and Intangible Heritage of Humanity from Indonesia because it still uses waxes in the making process.

Written batik (batik tulis)

Written batik or batik tulis (Javanese script: ꦧꦠꦶꦏ꧀ꦠꦸꦭꦶꦱ꧀; Pegon: باتيق توليس) is made by writing wax liquid on the surface of the cloth with a tool called canting. Canting made of copper with a handle made of bamboo or wood. The making of hand-written batik takes approximately 1–3 months depending on the complexity and detail of batik. Because the working techniques are still traditional and manual, making hand-written batik takes longer and is more complicated than other batik techniques. In addition, the fundamental difference between written batik compared to other batik is that there are differences in each pattern, for example, a number of points or curved lines that are not the same because they are made manually. This characteristic of hand-written batik makes hand-written batik more valuable and unique compared to other batiks.

Written batik technique is the most complicated, smooth, and longest process to work with, so a piece of original batik tulis cloth is usually sold at a higher price. However, this is the advantage of batik with the written process, which is more exclusive because it is purely handmade. In Indonesia, premium hand-written batik clothes are usually only worn by certain people at special events, in the form of long-sleeved shirts or modern batik dresses. The batik motif in Indonesia has developed depending on its history and place of origin.

Stamped batik (batik cap)

Stamped batik or batik cap (Javanese script: ꦧꦠꦶꦏ꧀ꦕꦥ꧀; Pegon: باتيق چڤ) is batik whose manufacturing process uses a stamp tool. This stamp tool is made of copper plates which form a batik motif on one of its surfaces. Stamp tool or canting cap is made by people who are experts in that field. Making batik with cap works the same way as using a stamp, but using waxes, not ink. This experience process is not easy to do. To make one piece of batik cloth, the process of deepening is carried out several times depending on the number of colors desired. Cap is used to replacing the canting function so that it can shorten the manufacturing time. Batik cap is produced from the process of dyeing a tool made of copper which has been shaped in such a way on the cloth. The batik cap motif is considered to have less artistic value because all the motifs are exactly the same. The price of printed batik is cheaper than written batik because it can be made en masse.

The distinctive feature of batik cap can be seen from the repeating pattern and/or ornament motif. Historically, this batik cap process was discovered and popularized by the brethren as a solution to the limited capacity of batik production if it was only processed with hand-written techniques (batik tulis). The process of making this type of batik takes approximately 2–3 days. The advantages of batik cap are easier, faster batik processing, and the most striking of which is the more neat and repetitive motifs. While the drawbacks of batik cap include the mainstream design because it usually goes into mass production, in terms of art it looks stiffer and the motifs are not too detailed, and what is certain is the possibility of having the same batik as other people is greater.

Painted batik (batik lukis)

Painted batik, batik painting, or batik lukis (Javanese script: ꦧꦠꦶꦏ꧀ꦭꦸꦏꦶꦱ꧀; Pegon: باتيق لوكيس) is a technique of making batik by painting (with or without a pattern) on a white cloth using a medium or a combined medium like canting, brush, banana stalk, broomsticks, cotton, toothpicks, patchwork, or other media depending on the expression of a painter. Batik painting is the result of the development of batik art. The essence of batik painting is the process of making batik that does not use traditional motifs that are commonly found. The resulting motifs are the creation of the maker, usually producing contemporary (free) motifs or patterns with brighter, more striking colors, and more diverse color variations. The coloring in painted batik tends to be free and plays with many colors that are not often found in written batik (batik tulis). There are also gradation effects and other painting effects. The drawings are made as if painted batik is an ordinary painting poured on cloth using wax as the medium.

In principle, painted batik is almost the same way with written batik in the making process. Because of the development of classic written batik, painted batik still contains the same elements as written batik in the aspects of materials, processing, coloring, and highlighting (removing the wax). But there are also many differences due to the influence of modern painting, such as in terms of appearance, especially in motifs and colors. The most important thing in making painted batik is the combination of the batik work and coloring depending on the taste of the batik maker. Painted batik is popular because it has a very affordable price and a very creative manufacturing process. Painted batik can be used as decoration or ready-to-wear clothing (fashion). Painted batik which has human objects, landscapes, still objects, and other objects, are in high demand for display paintings.

Making process
The making of Indonesian batik is a labor-intensive process. The following are the stages in the process of making the original batik tulis cloth from the first steps to the last process: nyungging, njaplak, nglowong, ngiseni, nyolet, mopok, nembok, ngelir, nembok, the first nglorod, ngrentesi, nyumri, nyoja, and the second nglorod.

Firstly, a cloth is washed, soaked, and beaten with a large mallet. Patterns are drawn with pencil and later redrawn using hot wax, usually made from a mixture of paraffin or beeswax, sometimes mixed with plant resins, which functions as a dye-resist. The wax can be applied with a variety of tools. A pen-like instrument called a canting (sometimes spelled with old Dutch orthography tjanting) is the most common. A canting is made from a small copper reservoir with a spout on a wooden handle. The reservoir holds the resist which flows through the spout, creating dots and lines as it moves. For larger patterns, a stiff brush may be used. Alternatively, a copper block stamp called a cap (old spelling tjap) is used to cover large areas more efficiently.

After the cloth is dry, the resist is removed by boiling or scraping the cloth. The areas treated with resist keep their original colour; when the resist is removed the contrast between the dyed and undyed areas forms the pattern. This process is repeated as many times as the number of colours desired.

The most traditional type of batik, called written batik (batik tulis), is drawn using only the canting. The cloth needs to be drawn on both sides and dipped in a dye bath three to four times. The whole process may take up to a year; it yields considerably finer patterns than stamped batik (batik cap).

Culture
Batik is an ancient cultural element that is widespread in Indonesia. Making batik, in the sense of written batik, is not only a physical activity but has a deep dimension that contains prayer, hope, and lessons. Batik motifs in ancient Javanese society have a symbolic meaning and can be used as a means of communication for ancient Javanese people. The ancient Javanese community realized that through batik motifs the social stratification of society could be identified.

Many Indonesian batik patterns are symbolic. Infants are carried in batik slings decorated with symbols designed to bring the child luck, and certain batik designs are reserved for brides and bridegrooms, as well as their families. Batik garments play a central role in certain Javanese rituals, such as the ceremonial casting of royal batik into a volcano. In the Javanese naloni mitoni ceremony, the mother-to-be is wrapped in seven layers of batik, wishing her good things. Batik is also prominent in the tedak siten ceremony when a child touches the earth for the first time. Specific pattern requirement are often reserved for traditional and ceremonial contexts.

Traditional costume in the Javanese royal palace
Batik is the traditional costume of the royal and aristocratic families in Java for many centuries until now. The use of batik is still sustainable and is a mandatory traditional dress in the rules of the Javanese palaces to this day. Initially, the tradition of making batik was considered a tradition that could only be practiced in the palace and was designated as the clothes of the king, family, and their followers, thus becoming a symbol of Javanese feudalism. Because many of the king's followers lived outside the palace, this batik art was brought by them outside the palace and carried out in their respective places. The batik motifs of each social class are differentiated according to social strata and nobility in the palace. The motifs of the Parang Rusak, semen gedhe, kawung, and udan riris are the batik motifs used by the aristocrats and courtiers in garebeg ceremonies, pasowanan, and welcoming honor guests. During the colonial era, Javanese courts issued decrees that dictated certain patterns to be worn according to a person's rank and class within the society. Sultan Hamengkubuwono VII, who ruled the Yogyakarta Sultanate from 1921 to 1939, reserved several patterns such as the Parang Rusak and Semen Agung for members of the Yogyakartan royalties and restricted commoners from wearing them.

Traditional dance costumes
Batik is used for traditional dance performances in Java. Costume is one of the main things in presenting traditional Javanese dance. Kemben is a piece of cloth worn from the chest to the waist. Tapih is used to fasten the jarit of the dancers, it is decorated with a distinctive batik motif, and fastened with a stagen belt. Sampur is used by wrapping them around the dancer's body. This cloth is also known as Kancrik Prade which is usually dominated by yellow or red. Jarit is a subordinate, uses a long batik cloth. Some examples of Javanese dances include Bedhaya, Srimpi, Golek, Beksan, wayang wong, gambyong, and so on.

Birth ceremonies (mitoni, tedak siten)
In Javanese tradition, when a mother-to-be reaches her seventh month of pregnancy, a seven-month event or a mitoni ceremony will be held. One of the things that must be done in the ceremony is that the prospective mother must try on the seven kebayas and seven batik cloths.
The batik used has rules and is not just any batik. Each batik cloth has a high philosophical value which is also a strand and hope for the Almighty so that the baby who is born has a good personality.

Prospective mothers must alternate wearing 6 batik cloths and 1 striated batik cloth. This batik substitution has a rule, that the last batik to be worn is the one with a simple motif. The motif rulers include:
Wahyu tumurun motif – This motif contains the hope that the baby will have a good position.
Cakar motif – This motif is expected to make the child diligent in seeking sustenance.
Udan liris motif – It is hoped that the child will have a tough character.
Kesatrian motif – It is hoped the child has a chivalrous nature.
Sidomukti motif – It is hoped that the child's life will be good and honorable.
Babon angrem motif – Motif depicting a hatchling hen, symbolizes the mother's love for her child.
Lurik lasem motif – The simplest motif. It has a philosophy that human life should be simple. There is also another philosophy, there are two lines in lurik lasem batik, namely the vertical line indicating the relationship between humans and God and the horizontal line indicating the relationship between humans and fellow humans.

Wedding ceremonies (siraman, midodareni, akad, panggih)
Every motif in classical Javanese batik always has its own meaning and philosophy, including for wedding ceremonies. Because each motif attached to Javanese batik has a different story and philosophy. In Javanese wedding ceremony, certain batik designs are reserved for brides and bridegrooms, as well as their families.
Such as the truntum motif (flower motif in the shape of the sun) is used for midodareni ceremony (the procession of the night before the wedding ceremony, symbolizing the last night before the child separates from parents). This motif is also used during the panggih ceremony (the procession when the bride and groom meet after being secluded) by the parents of the bride and groom. The truntum motif means a symbol of love that never ends, when used by the parents of the bride and groom, it symbolizes the love of the parents for the child that never ends.

Some of the batik motifs that can be used for weddings are the grompol motif (hopefully the bride and groom will get a blessing and a bright future), Sidho asih motif (hopefully that the bride and groom will love each other), Sidho luhur motif (hopefully that the bride will have a noble and praiseworthy character), and ceker ayam motif (hopefully the bride and groom have the spirit of being married and given prosperity).

Death ceremonies (lurub layon)
In Javanese society batik cloth is also used for death ceremonies, namely as a cover for the body or what is known as the lurub layon ceremony. The batik motif that symbolizes grief is the slobok motif. This batik motif symbolizes the hope that spirits will find it easy and smooth on their way to God. The word slobog is taken from the Javanese word lobok, which means loose. This motif is a geometric triangular shape that is usually black and white. The basic color of this batik is often black or brown with a natural dye which is often called soga.

In Madurese society, one of the batik motifs used for the cloth covering the corpse from generation to generation is the biren rice tompah motif. This biren leaf motif is filled with spilled rice using natural dyes. The washing also uses natural ingredients, squeezed papaya leaves.

Formal and informal daily dress
Contemporary practice often allows people to pick any batik patterns according to one's taste and preference from casual to formal situations, and Batik makers often modify, combine, or invent new iterations of well-known patterns. Besides that, now batik has become a daily dress whether it is at work, school, or formal and non-formal events in Indonesia. Many young designers have started their fashion design work by taking batik as their inspiration for making clothes designs. The creativity of these young designers has given birth to various designs of batik clothes that are very elegant and meet the demands of a modern lifestyle.

In October 2009, UNESCO designated Indonesian batik as a Masterpiece of Oral and Intangible Heritage of Humanity. As part of the acknowledgment, UNESCO insisted that Indonesia preserve its heritage. The day, 2 October 2009 has been stated by Indonesian government as National Batik Day, as also at the time the map of Indonesian batik diversity by Hokky Situngkir was opened for public for the first time by the Indonesian Ministry of Research and Technology.

Study of the geometry of Indonesian batik has shown the applicability of fractal geometry in traditional designs.

Patterns and motifs
The popularity of batik in Indonesia has varied. Historically, it was essential for ceremonial costumes and it was worn as part of a kebaya dress, commonly worn every day. The use of batik was already recorded in the 12th century, and the textile has become a strong source of identity for Indonesians crossing religious, racial, and cultural boundaries. It is also believed the motif made the batik famous.

Kawung 
The Batik kawung motif originated in the city of Yogyakarta and comes in a variety of styles. The motif has a geometrically organized pattern of spheres that resembles the kawung fruit (palm fruit). This pattern is thought to also be a representation of a lotus flower with four blooming crown petals, representing purity. The geometrically organized kawung pattern is seen as a representation of authority in Javanese society. Power is symbolized by the dot in the center of the geometrically aligned ovals. This reflects the position of rulers being the center of authority, which may now be understood as a depiction of the relationship between the people and the government. Other kawung symbolisms are connected to wisdom, such as representing the ancient Javanese philosophy of life of sedulur papat lima pancer. As a result, it is intended signify human existence, in the hopes that a person would not forget their roots. The color scheme of the kawung batik pattern, which includes a combination of dark and bright hues represents human traits. As the kawung pattern is frequently regarded as a palm tree's fruit that is thought to be extremely beneficial for people, it is believed that whoever uses this motif will have a positive influence on the environment. Furthermore, the kawung batik motif is seen as a sign of power and justice. Since the Kawung motif is frequently associated with a symbolism of authority and has many philosophical meanings, it was formerly used only by the Javanese royal family. Over time, numerous influences such as colonization have influenced its exclusivity, enabling the kawung motif to be utilized by the general public.

Parang 

The word  comes from the word coral or rock. The motif depicts a diagonal line descending from high to low and has a slope of 45 degrees. The basic pattern is the letter S. The meaning of the parang motif can be interpreted in two ways. Some speculate this theme is derived from the pattern of the sword worn by knights and kings when fighting. Others say Panembahan Senapati designed the pattern while watching the South Sea waves crash against the beach's rocks, with the ocean waves symbolizing the center of natural energy, or the king. The parang motif's oblique construction is also a sign of strength, greatness, authority, and speed of movement. The parang motif, like the kawung design, is a batik larang as it is exclusively worn by the monarch and his relatives. The size of the parang motif also represents the wearer's position in the royal family's hierarchy. The parang pattern has many variations, each of which has its own meaning and is allocated to a certain member of the royal family based on their rank. Barong, rusak, gendreh, and klithik are some variations of the parang motif. In general, the motif is meant to represent a person's strong will and determination. It also represents a strong relationship and bond, both in terms of efforts to improve oneself, efforts to fight for prosperity, as well as forms of family ties. Since members of the royal family are the only ones who may wear the parang motif, the parang batik is often passed down among generations.

Mega mendung 
The  pattern has become a symbol of the city of its origin, Cirebon, due to its widespread popularity. The entrance of the Chinese traders is credited with the birth of the mega mendung motif. The motif is formed like a cloud, representing nirvana and the transcendental notion of divinity in Chinese culture. In another variant, the inspiration for this motif came from someone having seen a cloud reflected in a puddle of water while the weather was overcast. Mega mendung motifs must have a seven color gradations. The motif's name means "the sky will rain", and the motif's seven color gradations are supposed to represent the seven layers of the sky. The term mendung, which means "cloudy", is used in the pattern's name to represent patience. This means humans should not be quick to anger and should exercise patience even when confronted with emotional events. The cloud's structure should also be consistent, as the direction must be horizontal rather than vertical. The clouds must also be flat, as the cloud's purpose is to shield those beneath it from the scorching sun. As a result, the mega mendung design communicates that leaders must protect their people.

Tujuh Rupa 

This pattern originates in Pekalongan and is the product of a fusion of Indonesian and Chinese cultures. Ceramic ornaments from China are frequently used in the Tujuh Rupa motif. However, the embellishments on these motifs sometimes include brilliantly colored ornaments of natural elements such as animals and plants. The Tujuh Rupa motifs signifies ancestral ties and to represent gentleness and compassion. The motifs portrayed frequently represent aspects of coastal people's life, such as their ability to adapt to other cultures.

Truntum 
The  pattern was developed by Kanjeng Ratu Kencana (Queen Sunan Paku Buwana III) in the years 1749-1799 as a symbol of true, unconditional, and eternal love. It embodies a hope that as love becomes stronger, it will become more fruitful. Truntum comes from the word nuntun (guide). According to legend, Kanjeng Ratu Kencana's spouse disregarded her because he was preoccupied with his new concubine. She was inspired to design a batik with a truntum motif shaped like a star after looking up at the clear, star-studded sky. The king subsequently discovered the Queen creating the lovely pattern, and his feelings for her grew stronger with each passing day. Furthermore, the truntum pattern represents loyalty and devotion. The parents of the bride and groom usually use this motif on the wedding day. The hope is that the bride and groom would experience such steadfast love.

Sogan 
As the coloring technique of this Soga motif employs natural dyes extracted from the trunk of the soga tree, the batik motif is therefore known as Sogan. Traditional Sogan batik is a kind of batik unique to the Javanese Keraton, specifically Keraton Yogyakarta and Keraton Solo. The traditional Keraton patterns are generally followed by this Sogan motifs.The colors of Sogan Yogya and Solo are what differentiates the two Sogan motif variations from each other. Yogya sogan motifs are predominantly dark brown, black, and white, whereas Solo sogan motifs are often orange-brown and brown. The Sogan motif uses five primary colors to represent the human nature: black, red, yellow, white, and green are the five colors. The color black is used to represent worldliness, while red represents anger, yellow represents desire, and white represents righteousness. Brown, on the other hand, is a hue associated with solemnity and the distinctiveness of the Javanese culture, which places a strong emphasis on the inner self as a means of expression and impression. Furthermore, the color brown can be viewed as a symbol of modesty and humility, signifying a closeness to nature, which in turn implies a connection to the people.

Lasem 
Lasem batik is a form of coastal batik that developed through a cross-cultural exchange between native Javanese batik that were influenced by the Keraton motif and the incorporation of foreign cultural aspects, particularly Chinese culture. Therefore, the Lasem Batik has a distinct look and is rich in Chinese and Javanese cultural subtleties. The Lasem motif is distinguished by its distinctive red hue, known as getih pitik or 'chicken blood'. This is not to imply it is coloured with chicken blood, but in the past, the dye powder, which was generally imported from Europe, was combined with Lasem water to turn it crimson. Even if it is close to the traditional Lasem hue, the red colour is now a little different. The Lasem motif comes in many variations, but the most common is that of China's famed Hong bird. The origin of the motif started when Admiral Cheng Ho's crew member Bi Nang Un is reported to have moved to Central Java with his wife Na Li Ni, where she learnt to create batik motifs. Na Li Ni is credited as being the first to use dragon designs, hong birds, Chinese money, and the color red in batik. As a result, the Lasem patterns and colors have symbolic connotations linked to Chinese and Javanese philosophy, resulting in the motif carrying a meaning of unity and a representation of Chinese and Javanese acculturation.

Sidomukti 
The  batik motif is a Surakarta, Central Java-based motif. The Sidomulyo motif has been developed into this motif, whereby Paku Buwono IV altered the backdrop of the white Sidomulyo batik motif to the ukel motif, which was eventually dubbed the Sidomukti batik motif. This batik design is a kind of Keraton batik produced using natural soga dyes. On Sidomukti batik cloth, the color of soga or brown is the traditional batik colour.  The term Sidomukti comes from the word Sido, which means "to become" or "accepted", and "mukti", which means "noble", "happy", "powerful", "respected", and "prosperous". As a result, the Sidomukti motif represents the desire to achieve inner and external happiness, or for married couples, the hope of a bright and happy future for the bride and groom. The Sidomukti motifs are made up of various ornaments with different meanings and philosophies. A butterfly is the main ornament of this motif. Enlightenment, liberty, and perfection are all associated with this ornamentation. Furthermore, the butterfly represents beauty, great aspirations, and a brighter future. The Singgasana ornament, also known as the throne ornament, is the second ornament. This ornament is meant to important positions, implying that the person who wears it will ascend in rank and status. It is also envisioned that the individual would be recognized and appreciated by a large number of people. The Meru ornament, often known as mountain ornaments, is the third ornament. Meru is defined as a lofty mountain top where the gods live in Javanese Hindu tradition. Because the Meru ornament represents grandeur, magnificence, and firmness, it represents a want for the wearer to be successful. The flower ornament is the last ornament, and it is intended to represent beauty. This ornament represents the hope for something wonderful in life that is sturdy and substantial to hang on to, despite the numerous challenges that may arise.

Sidomulyo 
The  batik motif dates back to the Kartasura Mataram period, when Sultan Pakubuwono IV changed the pattern's base with isen-isen ukel. The Sidomulyo pattern is a type of Keraton batik, and originates from Surakarta, Central Java. Sido means "to become" or "accepted" in Javanese, whereas mulyo means "noble”. During the wedding ceremony, a bride and groom generally wear a batik fabric with the Sidomulyo motif in the hope that the family would thrive in the future. Because the Sidomulyo and Sidolmukti batik motifs are essentially the same with the only difference being the minor color variations, the ornamentations and meanings of the two motifs are the same.

Sekar Jagad 
The  motif has been popular since the 18th century. The name Sekar Jagad is derived from the words kaart, meaning map in Dutch, and Jagad, meaning means world in Javanese, as the pattern resembles a map when viewed from above. As a result, Batik Sekar Jagad is intended to depict the beauty and diversity of the world's various ethnic groups. There are also others who claim that the Sekar Jagad motif is derived from the Javanese words sekar (flower) and jagad (world), as the motif could also symbolize the beauty of the flowers that are spread all over the world. The existence of curving lines matching the shape of islands that are adjacent to each other is one of the features of the Sekar Jagad motif, making it look like a map. This motif is distinct in that it is irregularly patterned, as opposed to other batik motifs that have a repeating pattern. The Sekar Jagad motif itself is also characterized by the presence of isen-isen in the island shaped lines of the motif that contains various motifs such as kawung, truntum, slopes, flora and fauna and others.

Terminology

Batik is traditionally sold in 2.25-metre lengths used for kain panjang or sarong. It is worn by wrapping it around the hip, or made into a hat known as blangkon. The cloth can be filled continuously with a single pattern or divided into several sections.

Certain patterns are only used in certain sections of the cloth. For example, a row of isosceles triangles, forming the pasung motif, as well as diagonal floral motifs called dhlorong, are commonly used for the head. However, pasung and dhlorong are occasionally found in the body. Other motifs such as buketan (flower bouquet) and birds are commonly used in either the head or the body.

 The head is a rectangular section of the cloth which is worn at the front. The head section can be at the middle of the cloth, or placed at one or both ends. The papan inside of the head can be used to determine whether the cloth is kain panjang or sarong.
 The body is the main part of the cloth, and is filled with a wide variety of patterns. The body can be divided into two alternating patterns and colours called pagi-sore ('dawn-dusk'). Brighter patterns are shown during the day, while darker pattern are shown in the evening. The alternating colours give the impression of two batik sets.
 Margins are often plain, but floral and lace-like patterns, as well as wavy lines described as a dragon, are common in the area beside seret.

Types
As each region has its own traditional pattern, batiks are commonly distinguished by the region they originated in, such as batik Solo, batik Yogyakarta, batik Pekalongan, and batik Madura. Batiks from Java can be distinguished by their general pattern and colours into batik pedalaman (inland batik) or batik pesisiran (coastal batik).  Batiks which do not fall neatly into one of these two categories are only referred to by their region. A mapping of batik designs from all places in Indonesia depicts the similarities and reflects cultural assimilation within batik designs.

Javanese batik

Inland batik (batik pedalaman)

Inland batik, batik pedalaman or batik kraton (Javanese court batik) is the oldest form of batik tradition known in Java. Inland batik has earthy colour such as black, indigo, brown, and sogan (brown-yellow colour made from the tree Peltophorum pterocarpum), sometimes against a white background, with symbolic patterns that are mostly free from outside influence. Certain patterns are worn and preserved by the royal courts, while others are worn on specific occasions. At a Javanese wedding for example, the bride wears specific patterns at each stage of the ceremony. Noted inland batiks are produced in Solo and Jogjakarta, cities traditionally regarded as the centre of Javanese culture. Batik Solo typically has sogan background and is preserved by the Susuhunan and Mangkunegaran Court. Batik Jogja typically has white background and is preserved by the Yogyakarta Sultanate and Pakualaman Court.

Coastal batik (batik pesisiran)

Coastal batik or batik pesisiran is produced in several areas of northern Java and Madura. In contrast to inland batik, coastal batiks have vibrant colours and patterns inspired by a wide range of cultures as a consequence of maritime trading. Recurring motifs include European flower bouquets, Chinese phoenix, and Persian peacocks. Noted coastal batiks are produced in Pekalongan, Cirebon, Lasem, Tuban, and Madura. Pekalongan has the most active batik industry.

A notable sub-type of coastal batik called Jawa Hokokai is not attributed to a particular region. During the Japanese occupation of Indonesia in early 1940, the batik industry greatly declined due to material shortages. The workshops funded by the Japanese however were able to produce extremely fine batiks called Jawa Hokokai. Common motifs of Hokokai includes Japanese cherry blossoms, butterflies, and chrysanthemums.

Another coastal batik called tiga negeri (batik of three lands) is attributed to three regions: Lasem, Pekalongan, and Solo, where the batik would be dipped in red, blue, and sogan dyes respectively. As of 1980, batik tiga negeri was only produced in one city.

Blackstyle batik (batik Irengan)
"Black-style Batik" or "Irengan batik" is batik with an average black background, this is because Ponorogo has always had activities that are close to magical practices, so most irengan batik from Ponorogo is used as a black magic ritual, Dutch people know batik irengan this with gothic batik.

Sundanese batik
There are several types of batik that come from Sundanese land.

Parahyangan batik
Sundanese or Parahyangan Batik is the term for batik from the Parahyangan region of West Java and Banten. Although Parahyangan batiks can use a wide range of colours, a preference for indigo is seen in some of its variants. Natural indigo dye made from Indigofera is among the oldest known dyes in Java, and its local name tarum has lent its name to the Citarum river and the Tarumanagara kingdom, which suggests that ancient West Java was once a major producer of natural indigo. Noted Parahyangan batik is produced in Ciamis, Garut, and Tasikmalaya. Other traditions include Batik Kuningan influenced by batik Cirebon, batik Banten that developed quite independently, and an older tradition of batik Baduy.

Bantenese batik
Bantenese batik employs bright pastel colours and represents a revival of a lost art from the Sultanate of Banten, rediscovered through archaeological work during 2002–2004. Twelve motifs from locations such as Surosowan and several other places have been identified. It is said that tribal people used to wear it.

Baduy batik

Baduy batik only employs indigo colour in shades ranged from bluish black to deep blue. It is traditionally worn as iket, a type of Sundanese headress similar to Balinese udeng, by Outer Baduy people of Lebak Regency, Banten.

Malay batik
Trade relations between the Melayu Kingdom in Jambi and Javanese coastal cities have thrived since the 13th century. Therefore, coastal batik from northern Java probably influenced Jambi. In 1875, Haji Mahibat from Central Java revived the declining batik industry in Jambi. The village of Mudung Laut in Pelayangan district is known for producing batik Jambi. Batik Jambi, as well as Javanese batik, influenced the Malaysian batik.

The batik from Bengkulu, a city on west coast of Sumatra, is called batik besurek, which literary means "batik with letters" as they draw inspiration from Arabic calligraphy.

Minangkabau batik
The Minangkabau people also produce batik called batiak tanah liek (clay batik), which use clay as dye for the fabric. The fabric is immersed in clay for more than one day and later designed with motifs of animal and flora.

Balinese batik
Batik making in the island of Bali is relatively new, but a fast-growing industry. Many patterns are inspired by local designs, which are favoured by the local Balinese and domestic tourists. Objects from nature such as frangipani and hibiscus flowers, birds or fishes, and daily activities such as Balinese dancer and ngaben processions or religious and mythological creatures such as barong, kala and winged lion are common. Modern batik artists express themselves freely in a wide range of subjects.

Contemporary batik is not limited to traditional or ritual wearing in Bali. Some designers promote Balinese batik as an elegant fabric that can be used to make casual or formal cloth. Using high class batik, like hand made batik tulis, can show social status.

Popularity

The batik industry of Java flourished from the late 1800s to the early 1900s, but declined during the Japanese occupation of Indonesia. With increasing preference of western clothing, the batik industry further declined following the Indonesian independence. Batik has somewhat revived at the turn of the 21st century, through the efforts of Indonesian fashion designers to innovate batik by incorporating new colors, fabrics, and patterns. Batik has become a fashion item for many Indonesians, and may be seen on shirts, dresses, or scarves for casual wear; it is a preferred replacement for jacket-and-tie at certain receptions. Traditional batik sarongs are still used in many occasions.

After the UNESCO recognition for Indonesian batik on 2 October 2009, the Indonesian administration asked Indonesians to wear batik on Fridays, and wearing batik every Friday has been encouraged in government offices and private companies ever since. 2 October is also celebrated as National Batik Day in Indonesia. Batik had helped improve the small business local economy, batik sales in Indonesia had reached Rp 3.9 trillion (US$436.8 million) in 2010, an increase from Rp 2.5 trillion in 2006. The value of batik exports, meanwhile, increased from $14.3 million in 2006 to $22.3 million in 2010.

Batik is popular in the neighboring countries of Singapore and Malaysia. It is produced in Malaysia with similar, but not identical, methods to those used in Indonesia. Batik is featured in the national airline uniforms of the three countries, represented by batik prints worn by flight attendants of Singapore Airlines, Garuda Indonesia and Malaysian Airlines. The female uniform of Garuda Indonesia flight attendants is a modern interpretation of the Kartini style kebaya with parang gondosuli motifs.

Batik museums
Indonesia as the origin and paradise of batik has several museums that store various types of batik cloth that are hundreds of years old and a collection of equipment for batik that is still well preserved and maintained. Here are some museums in Indonesia that hold various types of batik collections:

Museum Batik Keraton Yogyakarta

Museum Batik Keraton Yogyakarta is located inside the Palace of Yogyakarta Sultanate, Yogyakarta. The museum which was inaugurated by Sultan Hamengku Buwono X on 31 October 2005 has thousands of batik collections. Some of batik collections here include kawung, semen, gringsing, nitik, cuwiri, parang, barong, grompol, and other motifs.

These batik collections come from different eras, from the era of Sultan Hamengkubuwono VIII to Sultan Hamengkubuwono X. The batik collections come from gifts from sultans, batik entrepreneurs, and batik collectors. Not only batik, visitors can also see equipment for making batik, raw materials for dyes, irons, sculptures, paintings, and batik masks. Unlike other museums in the Yogyakarta Palace complex, the Batik Museum management does not allow visitors to bring in cameras. This is in order to protect the batik from being photographed by irresponsible people, to then imitate the motive. This museum is part of a tour package offered by the Yogyakarta Palace. Open every day from 08.00 to 13.30 WIB, on Fridays at 08.00–13.00 WIB, and closes at the palace ceremony day.

Museum Batik Yogyakarta
Museum Batik Yogyakarta is located at Jalan Dr. Sutomo 13A, Bausasran, Yogyakarta. This museum is managed by the married couple Hadi and Dewi Nugroho. On 12 May 1977, this museum was inaugurated by the Yogyakarta Special Region Regional Office of P&K. This museum occupies an area of 400 m2 and is also used as the owner's residence. In 2000, this museum received an award from MURI for the work 'The Biggest Embroidery', batik measuring 90 x 400 cm2. Then in 2001, this museum received another award from MURI as the initiator of the establishment of the first Embroidery Museum in Indonesia.
This museum holds more than 1,200 batik collections consisting of 500 pieces of written batik, 560 stamped batik, 124 canting (batik tools), and 35 pans and coloring materials, including wax. Its excellent collection consists of various batik fabrics from the 18th to early 19th centuries in the form of long cloths and sarongs. Other collections include batik by Van Zuylen and Oey Soe Tjoen, as well as batik made in the 1700s. Yogyakarta Batik Museum also provides batik training for visitors who want to learn to make batik, which results can be taken home. The museum is open every Monday to Saturday at 09.00–15.00.

Museum Batik Pekalongan
Museum Batik Pekalongan is located at Jalan Jetayu No.1, Pekalongan, Central Java. This museum has 1.149 batik collections, including batik cloth, hundreds of years old of batik wayang beber, and traditional weaving tools. Museum Batik Pekalongan maintains a large collection of old to modern batik, both those from coastal areas, inland areas, other areas of Java, and batik from various regions in Nusantara such as from Sumatra, Kalimantan, Papua, and batik technique type fabrics from abroad.

Not only displaying batik collections, but Museum Batik Pekalongan is also a batik training center and a batik learning center. Students and general visitors can learn to make batik or do research on batik culture. The museum opens every day from 08.00 to 15.00.

Museum Batik Danar Hadi

Museum Batik Danar Hadi is located on Jalan Slamet Riyadi, Solo City (Surakarta), Central Java. The museum, which was founded in 1967, offers the best quality batik collections from various regions such as the original Javanese Batik Keraton, Javanese Hokokai batik (batik influenced by Japanese culture), coastal batik (Kudus, Lasem, and Pekalongan), Sumatran batik, and various types of batik. This museum has a collection of batik cloth reaching 1000 pieces and has been recognized by MURI (Indonesian Record Museum) as the museum with the largest collection of batik. Visitors can see the process of making batik and can even take part in batik making workshop in person. Museum Batik Danar Hadi is open every day from 09:00 WIB in the morning to 16:30 WIB in the afternoon.

Museum Batik Indonesia
Museum Batik Indonesia which is located in Taman Mini Indonesia Indah (TMII), Cipayung, Jakarta is divided into six areas, namely the area of introduction, treasures, batik techniques, forms, and types of decoration, development of the batik world and the gallery of fame. Visitors can also enjoy the hundreds of batik motifs available in this place. The museum opens every day at 07.00 AM–10.00 PM.

Museum Tekstil Jakarta

Textile Museum (Jakarta) is located on Jalan KS Tubun No. 4, Petamburan, West Jakarta. On June 28, 1976, this building was inaugurated as a textile museum by Mrs. Tien Soeharto (First Lady at that time) witnessed by Mr. Ali Sadikin as the Governor of DKI Jakarta. The initial collections collected at the Textile Museum were obtained from donations from Wastraprema (about 500 collections), then further increased through purchases by the Museum and History Service, as well as donations from the community, both individually and in groups. Until now, the Textile Museum's collection was recorded at 1.914 collections.

The batik gallery is designed to showcase a number of ancient batik and batik developments (contemporary) from time to time. The batik gallery itself is the embryo of the National Batik Museum which is managed by the Indonesian Batik Foundation and the Jakarta Textile Museum. The museum opens on Tuesday–Sunday at 09.00–15.00.

Batik outside Indonesia

Malaysia

The origin of batik production in Malaysia it is known trade relations between the Melayu Kingdom in Jambi and Javanese coastal cities have thrived since the 13th century, the northern coastal batik producing areas of Java (Cirebon, Lasem, Tuban, and Madura) has influenced Jambi batik. This Jambi (Sumatran) batik, as well as Javanese batik, has influenced the batik craft in the Malay peninsula.

Dr. Fiona Kerlogue of the Horniman museum argued that the Malaysian printed wax textiles, made for about a century, are a different tradition from traditional Indonesian batik. The method of producing Malaysian batik is different, as the patterns are larger and simpler with only occasional use of the canting for intricate patterns. It relies heavily on brush painting to apply colours to fabrics. The colours also tend to be lighter and more vibrant than deep coloured Javanese batik. The most popular motifs are leaves and flowers. Malaysian batik often displays plants and flowers to avoid the interpretation of human and animal images as idolatry, in accordance with local Islamic doctrine.

India
Indians are known to use resist-dyeing with cotton fabrics. Initially, wax and even rice starch were used for printing on fabrics. Until recently  was made only for dresses and tailored garments, but modern  is applied in numerous items, such as murals, wall hangings, paintings, household linen, and scarves, with livelier and brighter patterns.  Contemporary  making in India is also done by the Deaf women of Delhi, these women are fluent in Indian Sign Language and also work in other vocational programs.

Sri Lanka

Over the past century,  making in Sri Lanka has become firmly established. The  industry in Sri Lanka is a small scale industry which can employ individual design talent and mainly deals with foreign customers for profit. It is now the most visible of the island's crafts with galleries and factories, large and small, having sprung up in many tourist areas. Rows of small stalls selling batiks can be found all along Hikkaduwa's Galle Road strip. Mahawewa, on the other hand, is famous for its  factories.

China

 is done by the ethnic people in the South-West of China. The Miao, Bouyei and Gejia people use a dye resist method for their traditional costumes. The traditional costumes are made up of decorative fabrics, which they achieve by pattern weaving and wax resist. Almost all the Miao decorate hemp and cotton by applying hot wax then dipping the cloth in an indigo dye. The cloth is then used for skirts, panels on jackets, aprons and baby carriers. Like the Javanese, their traditional patterns also contain symbolism; the patterns include the dragon, phoenix, and flowers.

Africa

The African wax prints (Dutch wax prints) was introduced during the colonial era, through Dutch's textile industry's effort to imitate the  making process. The imitation was not successful in Europe, but experienced a strong reception in Africa instead. Nowadays  is produced in many parts of Africa and it is worn by many Africans as one of the symbols of culture.

Nelson Mandela was a noted wearer of  during his lifetime. Mandela regularly wore patterned loose-fitting shirt to many business and political meetings during 1994–1999 and after his tenure as President of South Africa, subsequently dubbed as a Madiba shirt based on Mandela's Xhosa clan name. There are many who claim the Madiba shirt's invention. But in fact, according to Yusuf Surtee, a clothing-store owner who supplied Mandela with outfits for decades, said the Madiba design is based on Mandela's request for a shirt similar to Indonesian president Suharto's  attire.

Gallery

People wearing batik in Indonesia

Some Indonesian batik motifs

See also

African wax prints
Bagh print
Balinese textiles
Canting
Folk costume
Ikat
Madiba shirt
Kawung (batik)
Parang (batik)
Megamendung (batik)
Tujuh rupa (batik)
Malong
National costume of Indonesia
Sarong
Screen printing
Songket
Textile printing
Thetis Blacker, English batik artist
T'nalak

Notes

References

Sources
 Doellah, H.Santosa. (2003). Batik : The Impact of Time and Environment, Solo : Danar Hadi. 
 Elliott, Inger McCabe. (1984) Batik : fabled cloth of Java photographs, Brian Brake ; contributions, Paramita Abdurachman, Susan Blum, Iwan Tirta ; design, Kiyoshi Kanai. New York : Clarkson N. Potter Inc., 
 Fraser-Lu, Sylvia.(1986) Indonesian batik : processes, patterns, and places Singapore : Oxford University Press. 
 Gillow, John; Dawson, Barry. (1995) Traditional Indonesian Textiles. Thames and Hudson. 
 
 QuaChee & eM.K. (2005) Batik Inspirations: Featuring Top Batik Designers. 
 Raffles, Sir Thomas Stamford. (1817) History of Java, Black, Parbury & Allen, London.
 
 Sumarsono, Hartono; Ishwara, Helen; Yahya, L.R. Supriyapto; Moeis, Xenia (2013). Benang Raja: Menyimpul Keelokan Batik Pesisir. Jakarta: Kepustakaan Populer Gramedia. .
 Tirta, Iwan; Steen, Gareth L.; Urso, Deborah M.; Alisjahbana, Mario. (1996) "Batik: a play of lights and shades, Volume 1", Indonesia : Gaya . , 
 Nadia Nava, Il batik – Ulissedizioni – 1991

External links

 UNESCO: Indonesian Batik, Representative of the Intangible Cultural Heritage of Humanity – 2009
 Early Indonesian textiles from three island cultures: Sumba, Toraja, Lampung, exhibition catalogue from Metropolitan Museum of Art Libraries
 Batik, the Traditional Fabric of Indonesia an article about batik from Living in Indonesia
 iWareBatik | Indonesian Batik Textile Heritage A website devoted to Batik, Indonesian Textile enlisted by UNESCO as Intangible Cultural Heritage. It links Batik production with Tourism and Fashion in Indonesia

 
Textile arts
Indonesian clothing
Masterpieces of the Oral and Intangible Heritage of Humanity
National symbols of Indonesia
Indonesian culture
Textile techniques
Indonesian words and phrases
Indonesian inventions